Jhangli, Jangli or Rachnavi is an Indo-Aryan dialect spoken in Punjab. It is intermediate between Standard Punjabi and Saraiki. Its name is derived from the Pakistani city of Jhang. It is spoken throughout a widespread area, starting from Khanewal to Jhang District at either end of Ravi and Chenab. The term does not include the whole area of Punjab. As such it can be considered a subdialect of Jatki. Native people mostly use Jungli for their dialect. Jangli dialect is spoken by Indigenous people of Jhang, Tandlianwala, Kamalia,some areas of Chiniot,  and some areas of Sahiwal district

Phonology
Jangli's sound inventory includes implosive consonants, but unlike in Saraiki these do not have phonemic status, as they do not contrast with plain voiced consonants. The implosives are more common than in Saraiki, and their set contains the unusual for the area dental implosive, which contrasts with the regular retroflex implosive .

Similar dialects
 Shahpuri dialect
 Jhangvi dialect
Jatki language is a common name for the Jhangvi dialect, Shahpuri dialect and Dhani dialect. 
The glotlog codes for these are:
 shah1266
 jatk1238 
 jang1253

Notable jatki/jhangvi people

Sports personalities 
 Aleem Dar, cricketer and umpire
 Ghulam Shabber, UAE cricket player

Literary personalities 
Majeed Amjad, Urdu poet
 Nasir Abbas Nayyar, Pakistani Urdu language columnist
 Ishtiaq Ahmad (fiction writer)

Pirs/religious figures 
 Sultan Bahu, founder of the Sarwari Qadiri Sufi order
 Shah Jeewna, Sufi saint, founder of Qalandariyya order

Business people 
 Sheikh Waqas Akram, founder of Shalimar Transport

Scientists
 Abdus Salam, first Pakistani Nobel Laureate.
 Yash Pal, Indian scientist.
 Har Gobind Khorana, Indian American biochemist

See also
Heer Ranjha
Bar region

References

Bibliography 

 (requires registration)

Punjabi dialects